Piruetten was a senior international figure skating competition held in Hamar, Norway. Medals were awarded in men's singles, ladies' singles, and ice dancing. It later became a junior event held in some years as part of the ISU Junior Grand Prix series.

Senior medalists

Men

Ladies

Pairs

Ice dance

Junior medalists

Men

Ladies

Pairs

Ice dance

1992 Piruetten

The 1992 Piruetten was held on November 26–29, 1992. Medals were awarded in the disciplines of men's singles, ladies' singles, pair skating, and ice dancing.

Results

Men

Ladies

Pairs

Ice dance

1993 Piruetten

The 1993 Piruetten was held on October 27–31, 1993. Medals were awarded in the disciplines of men's singles, ladies' singles, pair skating, and ice dancing. It also served as the test event for the then upcoming 1994 Winter Olympic Games.

Results

Men

Ladies

Other Competitors: Marina Kielmann

Pairs

Ice dance

1995 Piruetten

The 1995 Piruetten was a senior-level international figure skating competition. Medals were awarded in the disciplines of men's and ladies' singles.

Results

Men

Ladies

1996 Piruetten

The 1996 Piruetten was a senior-level international figure skating competition. Medals were awarded in the disciplines of men's and ladies' singles.

Results

Men

Ladies

1997 Piruetten

The 1997 Piruetten was a senior and junior-level international figure skating competition. Medals were awarded in the disciplines of men's and ladies' singles.

Senior results

Men

Ladies

1998 Piruetten

The 1998 Piruetten was a senior-level international figure skating competition. Medals were awarded in the disciplines of men's and ladies' singles.

Results

Men

Ladies

References

Figure skating competitions
International figure skating competitions hosted by Norway
Hamar